Verona Township may refer to the following places in the United States:

 Verona Township, Huron County, Michigan
 Verona Township, Faribault County, Minnesota
 Verona Township, Adams County, Nebraska
 Verona Township, Essex County, New Jersey

See also
Verona (disambiguation)

Township name disambiguation pages